Juncusol is a 9,10-dihydrophrenathrene found in Juncus species such as J. acutus, J. effusus or J. roemerianus.

It can also be synthesized.

This compound shows antimicrobial activity against Bacillus subtilis and Staphylococcus aureus. It also has a toxic effect on estuarine fish and shrimp.

References

External links 
 Juncusol at kanaya.naist.jp/knapsack_jsp

Phenanthrenoids
Vinyl compounds